Mikano International Limited is a Nigerian company with interest in power generation, real estate and construction. This company offers sales, maintenance, assembly and distribution of power generation products, real estate development, and sales of construction equipment.

Headquartered in Lagos, Nigeria, Mikano assembles power generating sets from manufacturers; MTU Onsite Energy (Germany), Perkins and Stamford alternator (United Kingdom), providing diesel and gas generating sets ranging from 9kva to 20,000kva for homes and industries.

History

Established in 1993 with a focus on importing, servicing, and maintenance of generators, Mikano began to assemble generating sets in Nigeria.

Mikano has further diversified its activities from Power Generation into Steel fabrication, Electrical & Lightings, and Construction industry.
In 2016, it expanded its operation into the real estate space with its Karameh City Project, an industrial complex in Nigeria with eight warehouses measuring 7,200 square meters, located at Warewa, Ogun state.

Business Activities 
With initial interest in power generation, Mikano has diversified its business activities into Steel fabrication, Electrical & Lightings, and Real Estate/Construction industry, partnering with Schneider Electric, ABB, Raychem from TE Connectivity- being the official stockist of their MV & HV products; Philips Lightings- as the supplier of their Fittings & lightings products and Siemens for Type-Tested Compact Sub-Station.

Power Generation 

As an assembler of power generating sets for homes and industries, Mikano has various operational solutions including Compressed Natural Gas (CNG) power generating sets, Bi-fuel power generating sets operating on 70% gas and 30% diesel and Independent Power Producer (IPP) power plant solutions with Gas/Diesel power generation options, providing up to 60MW. Recently, the company signed a Partnership with MTU Onsite Energy; hence using MTU German Engine for generator ranges: from 300KVA –3500KVA. Mikano also offers MAN Diesel and Gas generators up to 20,000 KVA

Steel Fabrication 

In 2015, Mikano set up a steel fabrication factory to complement its expansion into the sector where it manufactures and fabricates steel designs for street-light-poles, Warehouse-racks, Supermarket Shelves and sound-proof canopies of all generators.

Products & Solutions 
Partnering with energy management companies like ABB & Schneider Electric, Mikano is involved in the sales and distribution of voltage products  and equipment in electrical distribution, service and maintenance of Generator-control/Customized Panels enhancing accessibility of these products to the Nigerian market.

Hyundai Construction Equipment & Forklifts 
Mikano serves as an official distributor for Hyundai Engineering & Construction Equipment and Forklifts distributing and servicing; Hyundai Hydraulic Excavators, Wheel Loader, Skid Steer Loader, Backhoe Loader and Forklifts (Diesel, Battery & LPG/Petrol) and other material handling products.

Real Estate and Construction 

In 2018, Mikano International Limited expanded Nigeria's real estate space with its Karameh City Project.

The project is its first industrial complex in Nigeria with eight warehouses measuring 7,200 square meters, located at Warewa, Ogun state. Mikano Construction unit also services development and execution of housing projects and high-rise buildings to turnkey developments and total infrastructural works.

Corporate Social responsibility 
Mikano has implemented various social responsibility initiatives focusing on STEM Projects and trainings for Nigerian students, and The Nigerian Police force through the donation of Police traffic stands across the country, and support for less-privileged and disadvantaged members of the society.

References

Construction and civil engineering companies of Nigeria
Energy companies of Nigeria
Construction and civil engineering companies established in 1993
Nigerian companies established in 1993
Energy companies established in 1993
Companies based in Lagos